John Jacob Hite Farm, also known as the Jason Hite Place, is a historic home and farm located near Lexington, Lexington County, South Carolina. It was built about 1870 and is a one-story, frame cottage with weatherboard siding and a gable roof. The house features an enclosed front roof on the left and a porch on the right. The farm complex includes a corncrib (c. 1900), two log barns (c. 1920), and one frame barn (c. 1920).

It was listed on the National Register of Historic Places in 1983.

References 

Farms on the National Register of Historic Places in South Carolina
Houses on the National Register of Historic Places in South Carolina
Houses completed in 1870
Houses in Lexington County, South Carolina
National Register of Historic Places in Lexington County, South Carolina